Yawray (Quechua for to burn, Hispanicized spelling Yauray) is a  mountain in the Andes of Peru. It is located in the Huancavelica Region, Huancavelica Province, Acobambilla District, and in the Junín Region, Huancayo Province, Chongos Alto District. Yawray lies west of Puka and Warmi Mach'ay. Yawray is situated northwest of Aqchiqucha and northeast of Warmiqucha which belong to the largest lakes of Peru.

References

Mountains of Huancavelica Region
Mountains of Junín Region
Mountains of Peru